The 2005–06 Romanian Hockey League season was the 76th season of the Romanian Hockey League. Six teams participated in the league, and Steaua Bucuresti won the championship.

First round

Final round

Playoffs

Final
CSA Steaua Bucuresti - SC Miercurea Ciuc 1-2, 4-0, 4-2, 1-0, 3-1

3rd place
Progym Gheorgheni - CSM Dunărea Galați 14-0, 8-2, 9-4

5th place
HC Miercurea Ciuc - Sportul Studențesc București 2-0, 6-3

External links
Season on hockeyarchives.info

Romanian Hockey League seasons
Romanian
Rom